Ooh, You Make Me Feel is the 13th single by English R&B band, Loose Ends, from their third studio album, Zagora. It was released in 1987 via Virgin Records in the UK. The song peaked at number 77 on the UK Singles Chart.

Track listing
7” Single: VS991
 "Ooh, You Make Me Feel"
 "Ooh, You Make Me Feel" (Dub Mix)

12” Single: VS991-12
 "Ooh,You Make Me Feel (Extended Mix)"
 "Ooh,You Make Me Feel (Percussapella Mix)"
 "Ooh,You Make Me Feel (Dub Mix)"

Cassette single VS991-12
 "Ooh,You Make Me Feel (Extended Mix)"
 "Ooh,You Make Me Feel (Percussapella Mix)"
 "Ooh,You Make Me Feel (Dub Mix)"

Chart performance

References

External links
 Ooh, You Make Me Feel (1987) - List of releases at Discogs.

1986 songs
1987 singles
Loose Ends (band) songs
Song recordings produced by Nick Martinelli
Songs written by Carl McIntosh (musician)
Songs written by Jane Eugene
Songs written by Steve Nichol
Virgin Records singles